Three Cases of Murder is a 1955 British horror omnibus film comprising three stories: "The Picture," "You Killed Elizabeth," and "Lord Mountdrago." Eamonn Andrews introduces each. Alan Badel appears in all three.

Cast

Main cast
 Orson Welles as Lord Mountdrago ("Lord Mountdrago" segment)
 John Gregson as Edgar Curtain ("You Killed Elizabeth" segment)
 Elizabeth Sellars as Elizabeth ("You Killed Elizabeth" segment)
 Emrys Jones as George Wheeler ("You Killed Elizabeth" segment)
 Alan Badel as Owen (segment "Lord Mountdrago") / Mr. X (segment "In the Picture") / Harry (segment "You Killed Elizabeth")
 André Morell as Dr. Audlin ("Lord Mountdrago" segment)
 Hugh Pryse as Jarvis ("In the Picture" segment)
 Leueen MacGrath as Woman in the House ("In the Picture" segment)
 Eddie Byrne as Snyder ("In the Picture" segment)
 Helen Cherry as Lady Mountdrago ("Lord Mountdrago" segment)
 Eamonn Andrews as Introductions

Supporting cast
 Peter Burton as Under Secretary for Foreign Affairs (segment "Lord Mountdrago")
 Philip Dale as Sgt. Mallot (segment "You Killed Elizabeth")
 Christina Forrest as Susan (segment "You Killed Elizabeth")
 Evelyn Hall as Lady Connemara (segment "Lord Mountdrago")
 Ann Hanslip as The Girl (segment "In the Picture")
 David Horne as Sir James (segment "Lord Mountdrago")
 John Humphry as Private Secretary (segment "Lord Mountdrago")
 Maurice Kaufmann as Pemberton (segment "You Killed Elizabeth")
 Jack Lambert as Inspector Acheson ("You Killed Elizabeth" segment)
 Zena Marshall as Beautiful Blonde (segment "Lord Mountdrago")
 John Salew as Rooke ("In the Picture" segment)
 Harry Welchman as Connoisseur (segment "In the Picture")
 Colette Wilde as Jane (segment "You Killed Elizabeth")
 Arthur Wontner as Leader of the House (segment "Lord Mountdrago")

Uncredited/Cameo cast
 Patrick Macnee as Guard Subaltern
 Marc Sheldon as Man in Background

Production
The first and third stories deal with the supernatural. In the first, "In the Picture", a museum worker enters one of the pictures in a gallery. In the second, "You Killed Elizabeth", two friends fall in love with the same woman. In the third, "Lord Mountdrago", a dramatization of a short story by W. Somerset Maugham from his collection The Mixture as Before, a politician seeks revenge on a political opponent by entering his dreams.

Wendy Toye directed "In the Picture";  David Eady, "You Killed Elizabeth"; and  George More O'Ferrall, "Lord Mountdrago."

Orson Welles received top billing, but he appears only in "Lord Mountdrago". According to Patrick Macnee, who had a supporting role, Welles began making suggestions to director George More O'Ferrall throughout the first day of filming, and by the third day he had taken over the direction of the entire segment.

Reception
The presence of Orson Welles in the cast meant the film was released in the US before the UK. The film was turned down for exhibition in the UK by both the Rank and Associated British chains. They claimed that the film was mediocre and that Welles was not a big enough box office draw to compensate for this.

References

External links

 
 

1955 films
1950s crime films
British mystery films
British anthology films
British crime films
British black-and-white films
Films directed by David Eady
Films directed by George More O'Ferrall
Films directed by Wendy Toye
Films produced by Ian Dalrymple
Films with screenplays by Ian Dalrymple
1950s English-language films
1950s British films